Mark Tollefsen (born November 21, 1992) is an American professional basketball player who last played for Maccabi Ashdod of the Israeli Premier League. He played college basketball for the University of San Francisco and University of Arizona before playing professionally in Estonia and Israel. In 2018–19, he was the top scorer in the Israel Basketball Premier League.

Early life and college career
Tollefsen attended San Ramon Valley High School in Danville, California, where he earned third-team All-East Bay and All-Metro honors after shooting 54.0 percent from the floor and 45.0 percent from the arc as a senior. Tollefsen helped lead San Ramon to a 28–4 record and a share of the EBAL title as a junior.

Tollefsen played college basketball at San Francisco, where he averaged 13.9 points, 5.4 rebounds and 1.5 assists in his junior year. He was  ranked fifth in the WCC in field goal percentage (.535), 10th in scoring average and 15th in rebounding average. On March 8, 2015, Tollefsen was named to the second-team All-West Coast Conference.

On April 27, 2015, Tollefsen transferred from San Francisco to Arizona as a graduate transfer. In his senior year at Arizona, he averaged 7 points and 3 rebounds and 1.2 assists while appearing in all 34 games with 13 starts.

Professional career

Kalev/Cramo (2016–2017)
On September 10, 2016, Tollefsen started his professional career with the Estonian team Kalev/Cramo, signing a one-year deal. On January 31, 2017, Tollefsen recorded a season-high 29 points, shooting 12-of-19 from the field, along with eight rebounds and three blocks in an 88–64 blowout win over Tallinna Kalev. On February 16, 2017, Tollefsen participated in the Estonian League All-Star Game. Tollefsen helped Kalev/Cramo to win the 2017 Estonian Cup and the 2017 Estonian League Championship.

Maccabi Rishon LeZion (2017–2018)
On August 20, 2017, Tollefsen signed with the Israeli team Maccabi Rishon LeZion for the 2017–18 season. On December 18, 2017, Tollefsen recorded a season-high 23 points, shooting 8-of-12 from the field, along with 12 rebounds, 6 assists and 5 steals in a 93–80 win over Bnei Herzliya.

Maccabi Ashdod (2018–2019)
On August 1, 2018, Tollefsen signed a one-year deal with Maccabi Ashdod. On January 24, 2019, Tollefsen recorded a double-double with a career-high 31 points and 10 rebounds, shooting 7-of-16 from the three-point range, along with two assists in a 100–104 overtime loss to Maccabi Tel Aviv. On May 6, 2019, Tollefsen recorded 27 points, shooting 6-of-10 from the three-point range, along with nine rebounds, leading Ashdod to a 101–92 win over Ironi Nes Ziona. He was subsequently named Israeli League Round 30 MVP. Tollefsen finished the season as the league top scorer with 20.4 points, along with 5.5 rebounds and 1.1 assists per game, while shooting 44.3 percent from three-point range.

Return to Ashdod (2020–present)
On February 8, 2020, Tollefsen returned to Maccabi Ashdod for a second stint, signing for the rest of the season.

Career statistics

Domestic Leagues

|-
| style="text-align:center;" rowspan=2 | 2016–17
| style="text-align:left;" rowspan=2| Kalev/Cramo
| style="text-align:center;" rowspan=1| KML
|| 28 || 25.9 || .530 || .364 || .729 || 4.7 || 1.3 || .7 || .7 || 12.0
|-
| style="text-align:center;" rowspan=1| VTB
|| 23 || 25.6 || .495 || .465 || .636 || 4.1 || .9 || .5 || .4 || 11.0
|-
| style="text-align:center;" rowspan=1 | 2017–18
| style="text-align:left;" rowspan=1| Rishon LeZion
| style="text-align:center;" rowspan=2| IPL
|| 24 || 26.5 || .498 || .333 || .775 || 5.4 || 1.0 || .7 || .7 || 12.0
|-
| style="text-align:center;" rowspan=1 | 2018–19
| style="text-align:left;" rowspan=1| Ashdod
|| 26 || 33.0 || .544 || .443 || .815 || 5.5 || 1.1 || .8 || .2 || style="background:#CFECEC;"|20.4
|-
|}
Source: RealGM

References

External links
 Arizona Wildcats bio
 RealGM profile

1992 births
Living people
American expatriate basketball people in Estonia
American expatriate basketball people in Israel
American men's basketball players
Arizona Wildcats men's basketball players
Basketball players from California
BC Kalev/Cramo players
Maccabi Ashdod B.C. players
Maccabi Rishon LeZion basketball players
People from Danville, California
Power forwards (basketball)
San Francisco Dons men's basketball players
Small forwards
Sportspeople from the San Francisco Bay Area